Kajuwadi is a small residential area located in the northern suburbs in the city of Mumbai. Kajuwadi has a police station which acts a centrally located station for residents in Chakala, JB Nagar, and the nearby areas.

References

Kajuwadi